Lyclene areolifera is a moth of the family Erebidae. It was described by Jeremy Daniel Holloway in 2001. It is found on Borneo. The habitat consists of various lowland forest types, including lower montane forests.

The length of the forewings is 8–10 mm for males and 10 mm for females.

References

Nudariina
Moths described in 2001
Moths of Asia